Meniscus may refer to:

Meniscus (anatomy), crescent-shaped fibrocartilaginous structure that partly divides a joint cavity
Meniscus (liquid), a curve in the upper surface of liquid contained in an object
Meniscus (optics), a type of optical lens
Meniscus (bacterium), a genus of bacteria

See also